The 2013–14 IRB Women's Sevens World Series was the second edition of the IRB Women's Sevens World Series, organized by the IRB annual series of tournaments for women's national teams in rugby sevens.

In August 2013, the IRB announced that the season would consist of six tournaments - in Dubai, the Atlanta suburb of Kennesaw, Georgia, São Paulo, Guangzhou and Amsterdam - played from November 2013 to May 2014, with a sixth tournament to be announced later. However, the sixth tournament never took place, and official literature referred to São Paulo as stop two of five. The number of teams in each of the events set at twelve, nine of which participated in all competitions of the season, while others might be identified by elimination or rankings of the six regions reporting to the IRB .

The competition
As in the case of the men's counterpart, the series winner will be the team that collects the most points throughout the season, based on individual tournament finishes.

The number of "core teams" that participate in all series events will increase to nine for the 2013–14 series, up from six in the inaugural series. The eight quarterfinalists in the 2013 Rugby World Cup Sevens were granted core team status for 2013–14:
 
 
 
 
 
 
 
 

In addition, the IRB has announced that  will be an invited core team for at least the 2013–14 series in an initiative to jump-start women's rugby development in the country, as Brazil is hosting the 2016 Summer Olympics.

The remaining participants in each tournament will be determined through regional qualifying.

Events

Points schedule
The season championship will be determined by points earned in each tournament. The scoring system, similar to that used in the men's IRB Sevens, was announced shortly before the season kicked off.

Cup Winner - 20
Cup Runner Up - 18
3rd Place - 16
Cup Semi Finalist - 14
Plate Winner - 12
Plate Runner Up - 10
Winner 7th/8th play-off - 8
Loser 7th/8th play-off - 6
Bowl Winner - 4
Bowl Runner Up - 3
Winner 11th/12th play-off - 2
Loser 11th/12th play-off - 1

Should teams finish equal on series points at the end of the season, the tiebreakers are the same as those in the men's series:
 Overall scoring differential in the season.
 Total try count in the season.
 If neither produces a winner, the teams are tied.

Rankings
Final standings for the 2013–14 series.

{| class="wikitable" style="font-size:92%;"
|-
!style="border-right:0px;" width:15px;"| 
!style="border-left:0px;"| Legend
|- 
|bgcolor=ccffcc|
|Qualified as a core team for women's rugby sevens World Series III
|-
|
|Did not directly qualify for women's rugby sevens World Series III
|}

Tournaments

Dubai

Atlanta

São Paulo

Guangzhou

Amsterdam

References

External links
 

 
2013-14
2014 rugby sevens competitions
2013 rugby sevens competitions
2014 in women's rugby union
2013 in women's rugby union